Rahul Prasad (born 9 May 1993) is an Indian cricketer. He made his first-class debut for Jharkhand in the 2018–19 Ranji Trophy on 28 November 2018.

References

External links
 

1993 births
Living people
Indian cricketers
Place of birth missing (living people)
Jharkhand cricketers